Brian Wright is an Australian former rugby league footballer who played for South Sydney and Eastern Suburbs in the New South Wales Rugby League premiership competition.

Wright began his New South Wales Rugby League (NSWRL) career with South Sydney in 1957 making 15 first grade appearances with that club. In 1960 the forward joined Eastern Suburbs, playing 29 matches in his two years at that club.

Wright was a member of the Easts side that went down to St George in the 1960 Grand Final. He is one of only a handful of players to be sent off in a Grand Final after Wright and St George's forward, Kevin Ryan, were dismissed for fighting midway through the second half of the match.

References

Career playing statistics

Point scoring summary

Australian rugby league players
Sydney Roosters players
Living people
Year of birth missing (living people)
Rugby league players from Sydney
South Sydney Rabbitohs players